Congress Street is the main street in Portland, Maine. Congress stretches from Portland's southwestern border with Westbrook through a number of neighborhoods before ending overlooking the Eastern Promenade on Munjoy Hill. In March 2009, the Portland City Council designated much of the inner portion of Congress Street an historic district. The western section of the street includes the city's Arts District.

History
When what is now Portland was founded by British colonists in the early 18th century, the population settled primarily on the waterfront near what is now India St. Congress was laid out and originally known as Back Street and later Queen Street. The first prominent structures on the street were the First Parish Meeting House, built in 1740 and replaced to the present structure in the 1820s as well as the hay scales in Market Square, later known as Monument Square. From the early settlement of Portland until the American Revolutionary War period, Back Street was considered the far edge of the town. It took the name of Congress Street beginning in 1823. 

In 1921, the Etz Chaim Synagogue was built on the eastern end of Congress Street approaching Munjoy Hill. As of 2011, it was the only immigrant-era synagogue still functioning in Maine.

A study in 2011 sought to change a number of features on the street, including decreasing the number of stoplights and ending left hand turns off of the street. Greater Portland planners also called the street the most congested artery in the region.

See also
 Munjoy Hill: Congress Street begins on the Eastern Promenade, located on Munjoy Hill
 Portland Observatory, 138 Congress St., historic marine signal tower and museum
 Eastern Cemetery, bounded by Congress and Mountfort Street at the base of Munjoy Hill
 North School, 248-264 Congress St
 Lincoln Park, between Pearl, Federal Congress and Franklin streets
 Etz Chaim Synagogue, 267 Congress St
 St. Paul's Church and Rectory, 279 Congress St
 Cathedral of the Immaculate Conception, 307 Congress St
 First Baptist Church, 353 Congress St.
 Central Fire Station, 380 Congress St.
 Press Herald Building, 390 Congress Street, between and Exchange and Market streets
 First Parish Church, 425 Congress St.
 Monument Square (also home to the Portland Public Library and One City Center buildings)
 Lancaster Block, 474 Congress St.
 Time and Temperature Building, 477 Congress St.
 Maine Historical Society & Longfellow House, 489 Congress St.
 Mechanics' Hall, 519 Congress St.
 Porteous, Mitchell and Braun Company Building (home of the Maine College of Art), 522-528 Congress St.
 Asa Hanson Block, 548-550 Congress St.
 Salt Institute for Documentary Studies, 561 Congress St.
 Green Elephant Vegetarian Bistro, 608 Congress St.
 State Theatre, 609 Congress St.
 Baxter Building, 619 Congress St.
 Maine Eye and Ear Infirmary, 794-800 Congress St.
 Portland Museum of Art, Congress Square at the intersection of Free and High Sts.
 Congress Square Park, a small park on the corner of High and Congress St.
 Henry Wadsworth Longfellow Monument, located in Longfellow Square at the intersection of Congress St., State St., and Pine St.
 West End: Congress Street passes through the West End
 Fore River Sanctuary, outer Congress St.
 Fore River, estuary in Portland which Congress Street crosses over
 Stroudwater, historic district near Fore River
 Tate House, located just off of Congress Street in Stroudwater

References

External links
 

History of Portland, Maine
Streets in Portland, Maine